The Itawamba County School District is a public school district based in Fulton, Mississippi, United States. The district's boundaries parallel that of Itawamba County.

Schools
Tremont Attendance Center (grades K-12), Former Principal Dawn Rogers
Itawamba Agricultural High School (grades 9–12), Principal Rick Mitchell
Dorsey Attendance Center (grades K-8) Principal Carson Cook
Fairview Attendance Center (grades K-8) Principal Mrs. Keitha O' Brian
Itawamba Attendance Center (grades K-8)
Mantachie Attendance Center (grades K-12)

Demographics

2006–07 school year
There were a total of 3,695 students enrolled in the Itawamba County School District during the 2006–2007 school year. The gender makeup of the district was 50% female and 50% male. The racial makeup of the district was 90.45% White, 8.15% African American, 1.00% Hispanic, 0.30% Asian, and 0.11% Native American. 42.1% of the district's students were eligible to receive free lunch.

Previous school years

Accountability statistics

Controversies 
In 2010, Itawamba Agricultural High School found itself in the national media twice for LGBT-related issues. In one incident, a transgender student was suspended for wearing heels and makeup. In another incident, the school's prom was cancelled after a lesbian student said that she wanted to bring her girlfriend and wear a tuxedo.

In 2011, Itawamba Agricultural High School received reports that several female students had been subjected to unwanted sexual comments and touching by some of the school's coaches. A student posted an original lyric concerning the incidents. The school transferred the student to another school as discipline. The student then brought a lawsuit against the school district. The case went to the United States Court of Appeals for the Fifth Circuit which ruled against the student who then asked the Supreme Court to hear an appeal on First Amendment grounds.

See also
List of school districts in Mississippi

References

External links
 

Education in Itawamba County, Mississippi
School districts in Mississippi